Oxted Hockey Club is a field hockey club that is based at Oxted School, in Oxted, Surrey. The club was founded in 1936, originally as the Oxted Women’s Hockey Club.

Club and history
The club runs six men's teams  with the first XI playing in the Men's England Hockey League Division One South  and three women's teams  with the first XI playing in the Women's South League. 

During the 2020–21 Men's Hockey League season, the league was cancelled due to COVID-19 pandemic but the men's team defeated Bowdon 3-2 in the final of the Men's Championship Cup.

Honours
 Men's Championship Cup winners 2020-21

References

English field hockey clubs
1936 establishments in England
Sport in Surrey